Emily Charlot Bölk (born 26 April 1998) is a German handballer for Ferencvárosi TC and the German national team.

Awards
Nemzeti Bajnokság:
Winner: 2021

Individual awards
MVP of the IHF Youth World Championship: 2014
All-Star Left back of the European Junior Championship 2015

Personal life
She is the daughter of Andrea Bölk.

References

External links

1998 births
Living people
German female handball players
Expatriate handball players
German expatriate sportspeople in Hungary
Ferencvárosi TC players (women's handball)
21st-century German women